Bountiful is an unincorporated community in Conejos County, in the U.S. state of Colorado.

The community is on the Denver and Rio Grande Western Railroad, between Romeo to the south and La Jara to the north.

The name Bountiful most likely is Mormon in origin.

References

Unincorporated communities in Conejos County, Colorado
Unincorporated communities in Colorado